Krostoszowice  is a village in Gmina Godów, Wodzisław County, Silesian Voivodeship, southern Poland. It has a population of 988 and lies near the border with the Czech Republic.

References

Villages in Wodzisław County